Rania Ali Musa Mamoun (Arabic:رانيا مأمون) is a Sudanese fiction writer and journalist, known for her novels, poems and short stories. She was born in the city of Wad Medani in east-central Sudan and was educated at the University of Gezira.

Career and literary achievements 
As a journalist, she has been active in both print media and television. In particular, she has edited the culture page of the journal al-Thaqafi, has written a column for the newspaper al-Adwaa and presented a cultural programme on Gezira State TV.

As a literary author, Mamoun has published two novels in Arabic, Green Flash (2006) and Son of the Sun (2013), as well as a short story collection Thirteen Months of Sunrise, which was translated into English by Elisabeth Jaquette. Her main characters in Green Flash are Ahmad and Nur, two Sudanese students in Cairo who are suffering from racism and injustice. According to literary critic Xavier Luffin, their discussions deal with themes worrying "their generation, such as the lack of freedom, the civil war, identity, racism, and unemployment."

Several of Mamoun's stories have appeared in English translation, for example in the anthologies The Book of Khartoum (Comma Press, 2016) and Banthology (Comma Press, 2018), as well as in Banipal magazine. The French anthology Nouvelles du Soudan (2010) included her story Histoires de portes (Stories of Doors).

In 2009, Mamoun was the recipient of an AFAC (Arab Fund for Arts and Culture) grant, and the following year, she was selected to participate in the second IPAF Nadwa, an annual workshop for young writers of Arabic literature. In his 2019 article about the Top 10 Books about Sudan in The Guardian, Sudanese-born writer Jamal Mahjoub characterised Mamoun's stories about everyday life in modern Khartoum as "prone to experimentation".

Commenting on Mamoun's 2023 collection of poems Something Evergreen Called Life,  translated by British-Syrian writer Yasmine Seale, poet Divya Victor wrote:

Works 

 Flāsh akhḍar (Green Flash), 2006

 Son of the Sun, 2013
 Thirteen Months of Sunrise, short stories, 2019
 Something Evergreen Called Life, poems, translated by Yasmine Seale, 2023

See also 
 Sudanese literature
 List of Sudanese writers
 Modern Arabic literature

References

Further reading 
 Mamoun, Rania and Elisabeth Jaquette (Translator) 2019. Thirteen Months of Sunrise. Manchester: Comma Press 
Al-Malik, A., Gaetano, S., Adam, H., Baraka, S. A., Karamallah, A., Mamoun, R., & Luffin, X. 2009. Nouvelles du Soudan. Paris: Magellan & Cie. (in French) 
 Cormack, Raph and Shmookler, Max (eds.) 2016. The Book of Khartoum. A City in Short Fiction. 
 Lynx Qualey, Marcia. Sudanese Literature: North and South. on ArabLit magazine

External links 

 Rania Mamoun at goodreads
Rania Mamoun's short story "Doors”, translated by Elisabeth Jaquette

1979 births
Sudanese journalists
Sudanese women journalists
Sudanese novelists
Sudanese women short story writers
Sudanese short story writers
Living people
21st-century Sudanese writers
21st-century women writers
Sudanese women writers